HinterReggio Calcio  was an Italian association football club located in Reggio Calabria, Calabria.

History

Foundation 
The club was founded in 2006 after the renaming of Polisportiva Scillese, of which it kept the colors.

In 2012, they were promoted to Lega Pro Seconda Divisione as Serie D champions. They were relegated back to Serie D after only one season.

In 2015, the club was dissolved.

The seasons 
 2006–07  Eccellenza Calabria
 2007–08  Eccellenza Calabria: Promoted to Serie D winning Coppa Italia Dilettanti
 2008–09  Serie D
 2009–10  Serie D
 2010–11  Serie D
 2011–12  Serie D: Promoted to Lega Pro Seconda Divisione
 2012–13  Lega Pro Seconda Divisione

Honours 
 Coppa Italia Dilettanti
Champions: 2007–08
 Coppa Italia Calabria:
Winners: 2007–08

Colors and badge 
The team's colors are white and blue.

Current squad 
 hinterreggio.it

Former players 

  Fabrizio Pratticò

References

External links 
Official homepage

Football clubs in Calabria
Sport in Reggio Calabria
Association football clubs established in 2006
Association football clubs disestablished in 2015
Serie C clubs